Calliostoma penniketi is a species of sea snail, a marine gastropod mollusk in the family Calliostomatidae.

Description
The height of the shell attains 60 mm.

Distribution
This marine species occurs off New Zealand.

References

 Marshall, B.A. 1995: A revision of the Recent Calliostoma species of New Zealand (Mollusca: Gastropoda: Trochoidea). The Nautilus 108: 83–127 (p. 115)

External links
 

penniketi
Gastropods described in 1995